Alice Walker: Beauty in Truth is a documentary film directed by Pratibha Parmar, made by Kali Films production company. The film follows the life of the Pulitzer Prize-winning author, poet and activist Alice Walker. Shooting began in May 2011. It was aired on the BBC on Monday July 8, 2013, and on PBS on February 7, 2014.

Alice Walker and Pratibha Palmer have previously collaborated on A Place of Rage and Warrior Marks.

References

External links 
 
 Alice Walker: Beauty in Truth – full video at PBS.org

Documentary films about women writers
Alice Walker
American documentary films
British documentary films
2013 films
2013 documentary films
2010s American films
2010s British films